Ooni Ojigidiri was the 37th Ooni of Ife, a paramount traditional ruler of Ile Ife, the ancestral home of the Yorubas. He succeeded Ooni Adagba and was succeeded by  
Ooni Akinmoyero.

References

Oonis of Ife
Yoruba history